Jeffrey Allen Stevens (born September 5, 1983) is an American retired professional baseball pitcher who is currently an area scout for the Baltimore Orioles of Major League Baseball. During his active career, he worked in 33 MLB games pitched, all in relief, for the 2009–2011 Chicago Cubs.

Early life

Stevens was born in Berkeley, California. He graduated from Campolindo High School in Moraga, California.

College

Stevens started, and relieved at Loyola Marymount College in Los Angeles, California from 2003-05. While at LMU, Stevens recorded back-to-back All-Conference honors in 2004 and 2005.  Over his three-year stint as an LMU Lion, Stevens recorded a 14-10 record with a 4.43 ERA in 64 appearances, 30 of them starts.

Stevens was drafted by the Reds in the sixth round of the 2005 Major League Baseball Draft.

Professional career

Stevens made his professional debut with the Billings Mustangs in 2005, going 4-4 with a 2.98 ERA.

Stevens started 2006 with the Single-A Dayton Dragons. He was traded to the Cleveland Indians as the player to be named later in the Brandon Phillips trade. He was assigned to Single-A Lake County Captains where he spent the remainder of the 2006 season.

In 2007, Stevens was moved to the bullpen and began the year with the Kinston Indians. He was 3-2 with a 2.31 ERA, with 37 strikeouts in 35 innings pitched for Kinston. He was promoted to Double-A Akron Aeros where he was 3-1 with a 3.17 ERA and 2 saves in 34 games.

Stevens began the  campaign with the Aeros. After going 5-1 with a 2.51 ERA, he earned a promotion to the Triple-A Buffalo Bisons. He was 0-2 with a 4.00 ERA when his season ended as a result of being named to the US Olympic Baseball Team to play in Beijing.

In December 2008, Stevens was traded from the Cleveland Indians to the Chicago Cubs in a deal for Mark DeRosa.

On July 10, 2009 Stevens made his Major League debut for the Chicago Cubs.  Stevens had a 1-2-3 MLB debut, getting Joe Thurston, Chris Duncan and Brendan Ryan in order in the 9th inning of an 8-3 loss to the Cardinals. He was optioned back to the minor leagues on August 5, 2009 when Aaron Miles was activated from the 15-day disabled list.

He was designated for assignment by the Cubs on May 30, 2011.

Stevens signed a minor league contract with the New York Mets on January 4, 2012. Stevens spent most of the year with Triple-A Buffalo, going 1-1 with a 3.32 ERA in 34 games, finishing 12 of them, while striking out 33 in 40.2 innings.

On November 22, 2012, Stevens signed a minor league deal with the organization he started it all with, the Cincinnati Reds. He was then released on March 24.

Stevens signed with the Southern Maryland Blue Crabs of the independent Atlantic League for the 2013 season. In 47 games with Southern Maryland, he went 4-3 with 14 games finished and a 3.98 ERA, striking out 43 in 61 innings.  He then retired from the field, and the Orioles named Stevens an area scout in Nevada and Northern California in February 2014.

2008 Beijing Olympics

With the score tied at 7, Lee Taek-Keun advanced to third base when Stevens attempted to pick him off at first, but threw the ball erratically. This was scored as an error. It was a costly one as the batter then hit a sacrifice fly and Lee scored, winning the game for Korea.

References

External links

Jeff Stevens at Baseball Almanac

1983 births
Living people
Akron Aeros players
Baltimore Orioles scouts
Baseball players at the 2008 Summer Olympics
Baseball players from Berkeley, California
Billings Mustangs players
Binghamton Mets players
Buffalo Bisons (minor league) players
Chicago Cubs players
Dayton Dragons players
Iowa Cubs players
Kinston Indians players
Lake County Captains players
Loyola Marymount Lions baseball players
Major League Baseball pitchers
Medalists at the 2008 Summer Olympics
Olympic bronze medalists for the United States in baseball
Southern Maryland Blue Crabs players
Tennessee Smokies players
People from Moraga, California